This list of defunct dental schools in the United States includes former dental schools that had previously awarded either Doctor of Dental Medicine (DMD) or Doctor of Dental Surgery (DDS) degree. Either one of these degrees was required to practice as a dentist in the United States. DMD and DDS granting dental schools are accredited by the Commission on Dental Accreditation (CODA), which is under the American Dental Association (ADA).

Georgia

Emory University School of Dentistry, Atlanta (1988)

Illinois

Loyola University School of Dentistry, Chicago (1993)
Northwestern University Dental School, Evanston (2001)

Louisiana

Loyola University New Orleans (1970)

Missouri

Saint Louis University School of Dentistry, St. Louis (1967)
Washington University School of Dental Medicine, St. Louis (1991)

New Jersey

Fairleigh Dickinson University School of Dental Medicine, Rutherford (1990)

Ohio

Dr. John Harris Dental School, Dainbridge (was the first formal dental school in the United States, but was not accredited by CODA)
Ohio College of Dental Surgery, Cincinnati (1926)

Oklahoma

Oral Roberts University Michael Cardone Sr. School of Dentistry, Tulsa (1986)

Pennsylvania

Pennsylvania College of Dental Surgery, Philadelphia (1909)

Tennessee

Vanderbilt University, Nashville (1920) ?

Washington, D.C.

Georgetown University School of Dentistry (1990)

See also
List of defunct medical schools in the United States
Dentistry
List of dental schools in the United States
List of medical schools in the United States

References

External links
American Dental Association
American Dental Education Association

 
United States
Dental